The Maricopa Freeway is one of the named principle freeways in the Phoenix metropolitan area. It consists of the following segments:
Interstate 17 in Phoenix, from the Durango Curve to The Split (Interstate 10)
Interstate 10, from The Split to Loop 202 in Chandler

Freeways in the Phoenix metropolitan area
Interstate 10